The 1991 Tipperary Senior Hurling Championship was the 101st staging of the Tipperary Senior Hurling Championship since its establishment by the Tipperary County Board in 1887. The championship began on 13 October 1991 and ended on 10 November 1991.

Holycross-Ballycahill were the defending champions.

On 10 November 1991, Cashel King Cormacs won the title after a 2-08 to 1-05 defeat of Holycross-Ballycahill in the final at Semple Stadium. It remains their only championship title.

Participating teams

Results

Quarter-finals

Semi-finals

Final

Championship statistics

Top scorers

Top scorers overall

Top scorers in a single game

References

External links

 The Senior Hurling Championship (1991)

Tipperary
Tipperary Senior Hurling Championship